The North-South Corridor of the Ahmedabad Metro is a metro route of the mass rapid transit system in Ahmedabad, India.

History

Phase-1 

The line is completely elevated. It will connect Motera Stadium to APMC, Vasna and will be passing through Sabarmati, AEC, Sabarmati Railway station, Ranip, Vadaj, Vijaynagar, Usmanpura, Old High court, Gandhigram, Paldi, Shreyas, Rajivnagar and Jivraj stations. The Phase-1 of the North-South Corridor was inaugurated on 30 September 2022 by Indian Prime Minister Narendra Modi. It was opened to public on 6 October 2022 except Sabarmati Railway Station metro station which is under construction.

Phase-2 
The Government of Gujarat approved the Phase-2 in October 2017 and revised it in October 2018. It will extend the North-South corridor from Motera in Ahmedabad to Mahatma Mandir in Gandhinagar (23.838 km) with a branch line from Gujarat National Law University (GNLU) linking Pandit Deendayal Energy University (PDEU) and GIFT City (5.416 km). The Phase-2 will have total 28.26 km-long elevated corridor with 22 stations.

The tendering for the Phase 2 began in January 2020. On 18 January 2021, the foundation stone of the Phase-2 was laid by Prime Minister Modi. The branch line connecting to GIFT City is expected to open in early 2024.

List of stations

Main Line 
Following is a list of stations on this route:

Branch Line 
Following is a list of stations on this route:

References 

Ahmedabad Metro lines